The 2014 Shreveport mayoral election resulted in the election of the Democrat Ollie Tyler as the first African-American female mayor of Shreveport. She defeated Victoria Provenza in the runoff election to succeed the term-limited incumbent Cedric Glover. The nonpartisan blanket primary was held on November 4, 2014, and as no candidate obtained the required majority, the general election followed on December 6, 2014.

No Republican sought the position.

Results

|}

|}

References

Shreveport
Government of Shreveport, Louisiana
Shreveport mayoral
December 2014 events in the United States